Untold Stories: A Collection of Hits is the first compilation by American country music artist Kathy Mattea. It was released in 1990 on Mercury Records and has been certified platinum by the RIAA. The album includes eight of her previous singles, as well as one newly recorded track ("A Few Good Things Remain"), and an album cut from 1987's Untasted Honey, the Tim O'Brien duet "The Battle Hymn of Love". Both of these songs were released as singles in 1990, and both reached #9 on the Billboard country charts.

Critical reception
AllMusic's William Ruhlmann writes, "Kathy Mattea has risen to near the top of the Nashville ranks because of a haunting, soulful voice, well-produced recordings that have a simple, folkie directness, and, most especially, an amazing talent for picking the best songs being written for the country market"

Track listing

Track information and credits adapted from the album's liner notes.

Charts

Weekly charts

Year-end charts

Certifications

Release history

References

1990 greatest hits albums
Kathy Mattea albums
Albums produced by Allen Reynolds
Mercury Records compilation albums